Wikipediavision is a site that shows in semi-realtime where anonymous edits to Wikipedia are originating from.  It was launched in the fall of 2007 by László Kozma, at that time a student in Finland.  The site combines Wikipedia's recent changes feed with Google Maps for 2D view to visualize the location-based service edits.

See also
Real-time web
WikiScanner

References

Websites which use Wikipedia